East Keansburg is an unincorporated community located within Middletown Township in Monmouth County, New Jersey, United States. As the name suggests, the area is east of Keansburg with Route 36 bordering the south, Port Monmouth to the east across Pews Creek, and the Raritan Bay to the north. The community is included in the generalized North Middletown region of the township.

East Keansburg is surrounded by an earthen levee (known as "the dike") constructed as protection against flooding, during large storms such as Hurricane Sandy.

The community includes the Tonya Keller Community Center, McMahon Park, and Ideal Beach along the bay. East Keansburg Fire Company #1 and Middletown Township First Aid & Rescue Squad are both located in East Keansburg. Portions of the Keansburg High School grounds are in Middletown/East Keansburg.

References

Middletown Township, New Jersey
Unincorporated communities in Monmouth County, New Jersey
Unincorporated communities in New Jersey